Rick Steff is a Memphis keyboard artist who has recorded with bands such as Lucero, Cat Power, Dexys Midnight Runners, and Hank Williams Jr.  Rick's father is Dick Steff, a trumpet player who appeared on many songs with Elvis Presley, and Dusty Springfield.  After beginning his career playing with a variety of Memphis musicians, in the early 1980s Steff moved to England and recorded as the organist for Dexy's Midnight Runners. After returning to America, Rick spent six years touring with Hank Williams Jr. until 1994. While playing with Williams, he also appeared on Don Nix's 1994 album, Back To The Well. He played on the Grammy Award nominated James Blood Ulmer album, Memphis Blood, in 2001.  In 2006, he served as musical director for Cat Power's The Greatest Tour. Also in 2006, he made an appearance playing accordion and piano on George Thorogood's album The Hard Stuff.
In 2009, Steff appeared on Klaus Voormann's debut solo album A Sideman's Journey, with Paul McCartney, Ringo Starr, Dr John and others. Steff has also recorded with Huey Lewis and the News. In 2019 he played Hammond B3 and synthesizer on the Samatha Fish album Kill or Be Kind.

In May 2013, he released his first solo recording, a three-song EP titled Rick's Booogie.

References

Living people
American male musicians
Year of birth missing (living people)
Musicians from Memphis, Tennessee